Killer cell lectin-like receptor subfamily G member 1 is a protein that in humans is encoded by the KLRG1 gene.

Function 

Natural killer (NK) cells are lymphocytes that can mediate lysis of certain tumor cells and virus-infected cells without previous activation. They can also regulate specific humoral and cell-mediated immunity. The protein encoded by this gene belongs to the killer cell lectin-like receptor (KLR) family, which is a group of transmembrane proteins preferentially expressed in NK cells. Studies in mice suggested that the expression of this gene may be regulated by MHC class I molecules.

KLRG1 is a lymphocyte co-inhibitory, or immune checkpoint, receptor expressed predominantly on late-differentiated effector and effector memory CD8+ T and NK cells. Its ligands are E-cadherin and N-cadherin with similar affinities, respective markers of epithelial and mesenchymal cells. Targeting of other co-inhibitory receptors for applications in oncology has gained widespread interest (e.g., CTLA-4, PD-1, and its ligand PD-L1). Unlike the obvious enhanced immune activation present in CTLA-4 and PD-1 gene knockout mice,  KLRG1 knockout mice initially were found to have no abnormal features, though were subsequently found to have enhanced immunity in a tuberculosis challenge model.

The characterization of KLRG1 as a “senescent” marker, but other co-inhibitory receptors as “exhaustion” markers, has contributed to relatively fewer studies on this molecule.

References

Further reading

External links